Northern Division was a two-member parliamentary electorate in the Auckland Region, New Zealand from 1853 to 1870.

Geographic distribution

The southern boundary went through the Manukau and Waitematā Harbours, but excluded the areas covered by the City of Auckland and Suburbs of Auckland electorates. The area south of the harbours was covered by the Southern Division electorate. In the north, the electorate originally went nearly as far as Whangarei on the east coast, and included the area around Dargaville on the west coast. The Electoral Districts Act 1858 established four new electorates. The Northern Division and  electorates were combined and redivided, and the  electorate was formed and placed between the two electorates, but the vast majority of the new electorate's area came from the Northern Division. After this division, the northern boundary was just north of Warkworth.

History
The 1855 general election was contested by four candidates. The two incumbents, Thomas Forsaith and Walter Lee stood against Thomas Henderson and Mr May. They received 292, 294, 363 and 213 votes, respectively. Henderson and Lee were thus declared elected, and the incumbent Forsaith was beaten by two votes.

Henderson represented the electorate in the 2nd Parliament from October 1855 to his resignation on 30 March 1860. He won the resulting 23 May 1860 by-election and represented the electorate until its dissolution on 6 November 1860. He was elected again for the 3rd Parliament in January 1861, and the 4th Parliament in February 1866, but he resigned on 5 June 1867.

Thomas Macfarlane was elected on 1 July 1867, succeeding Henderson. James O'Neill resigned in 1869 and was succeeded by Harry Farnall.

Members of Parliament
Key

Election results

1867 by-election

1853 election

 
 
 
 
 
 

Table footnotes:

Notes

References

Historical electorates of New Zealand
1853 establishments in New Zealand
1870 disestablishments in New Zealand